Lottery Lover is a 1935 American comedy film directed by Wilhelm Thiele and written by Franz Schulz and Billy Wilder. The film stars Lew Ayres, Pat Paterson, Peggy Fears, Sterling Holloway, Walter Woolf King and Alan Dinehart. The film was released on January 4, 1935, by Fox Film Corporation.

Plot
A crew of young military-school cadets are enjoying their first weekend in Paris. Frank Harrington, a girl-shy cadet, wins the lottery which "They" have organized, and Frank wins the right to woo the star of the Folies Bergere, Gaby Aimee, with her garter serving as proof of conquest. Meanwhile Frank has found the one girl-of-his-heart, Patty, and this serves to complicate matters.

Cast 
Lew Ayres as Cadet Frank Harrington
Pat Paterson as Patty
Peggy Fears as Gaby Aimee
Sterling Holloway as Cadet Harold Stump
Walter Woolf King as Prince Midanoff
Alan Dinehart as Edward Arthur 'Tank' Tankersley
Reginald Denny as Capt. Payne
Edward Nugent as Gibbs 
Rafaela Ottiano as Gaby's Maid
Dick Foran as Cadet

References

External links 
 

1935 films
1930s English-language films
Fox Film films
American comedy films
1935 comedy films
Films directed by Wilhelm Thiele
American black-and-white films
Films with screenplays by Billy Wilder
Films with screenplays by Franz Schulz
Films scored by Arthur Lange
Films about lotteries
1930s American films